Michael Hordy (born October 10, 1956 in Thunder Bay, Ontario) is a Canadian retired professional ice hockey player who played eleven games in the National Hockey League for the New York Islanders.

Career statistics

External links

1956 births
Canadian ice hockey defencemen
Fort Worth Texans players
Houston Aeros draft picks
Ice hockey people from Ontario
Sportspeople from Thunder Bay
Indianapolis Checkers (CHL) players
Living people
Maine Mariners players
Muskegon Mohawks players
New York Islanders draft picks
New York Islanders players
Sault Ste. Marie Greyhounds players